İlyas Kahraman (born March 31, 1976 in Istanbul) is a Turkish retired professional soccer player. He was a midfielder and in the 2000-01 season he was suspended from football for six months after failing a doping test.

Biography
After being promoted from Galatasaray's youth club to senior club, Ilyas played for Galatasaray. His career dramatically changed after he missed a crucial penalty in a historical Turkish Cup match against Gençlerbirliği on November 28, 1996. After leaving Galatasaray, he played for Gaziantepspor, Yimpaş Yozgatspor, Denizlispor, Malatyaspor, Bursaspor and Diyarbakırspor. After Diyarbakırspor were relegated Kahraman has been transferred to recently promoted Antalyaspor.

On 2000-01 season he was suspended from football for six months after failing a doping test.

Kahraman made his debut for Antalyaspor in Çaykur Rizespor match on 6 August 2006. He also played in İstanbul Büyükşehir Belediyespor between 2007-2009.

External links
Profile at TFF

References

1976 births
Living people
Turkish footballers
Antalyaspor footballers
Bursaspor footballers
Galatasaray S.K. footballers
Malatyaspor footballers
Denizlispor footballers
Diyarbakırspor footballers
İstanbul Başakşehir F.K. players
Süper Lig players
Boluspor footballers
Footballers from Istanbul
Doping cases in association football
Turkish sportspeople in doping cases
Turkey youth international footballers

Association football midfielders